Āb Bārīk (Arabic: , also called Āo Barik, Avbarik, Aw Bārīk, Awbāṟīk) is a village in Ghor Province, in central Afghanistan.

See also
Ghōr Province

References

Populated places in Ghor Province
Villages in Afghanistan